Black Forest FC is a football club from Mmankgodi, Botswana, currently playing in the Botswana Premier League. They are known as Magoleng by their fans. The club colours are green and black.

History
The club were formed in 1998.

They were promoted to the Botswana Premier League after winning the 2015-16 Division One South. They hired Zimbabwean coach Gilbert Mushangazhike in 2017.

References

Football clubs in Botswana